Randburg Hockey Stadium, known as the Randburg Astroturf , is a field hockey stadium in Randburg, Johannesburg, South Africa.

See also 
1999 All-Africa Games
2002 Women's Hockey Champions Challenge
2012 Men's Junior Africa Cup for Nations
2015 African Olympic Qualifier
Premier Hockey League
2016–17 Men's FIH Hockey World League Semifinals

References

Sports venues in Johannesburg
Field hockey venues in South Africa